Georg Alfred Broe (January 2, 1923 – 1998) was a Danish surrealist artist.

External links
Paintings from Georg Broe

1923 births
1998 deaths
20th-century Danish painters